Lauri Johannes "Lasse" Virtanen (3 August 1904 – 8 February 1982) was a Finnish long-distance runner, winner of bronze medals in the 5000 metres and 10,000 metres at the 1932 Summer Olympics in Los Angeles. He finished fourth in the 5000 metres at the 1934 European Championships. His brother Eino was an Olympic wrestler.

References 

1904 births
1982 deaths
People from Salo, Finland
Finnish male long-distance runners
Olympic athletes of Finland
Athletes (track and field) at the 1932 Summer Olympics
Olympic bronze medalists for Finland
Medalists at the 1932 Summer Olympics
Olympic bronze medalists in athletics (track and field)
Sportspeople from Southwest Finland